An entrée in modern French table service and that of much of the English-speaking world is a dish served before the main course of a meal. Outside North America, it is generally synonymous with the terms hors d'oeuvre, appetizer, or starter. It may be the first dish served, or it may follow a soup or other small dish or dishes.

In the United States and parts of Canada, the term entrée instead refers to the main dish or the only dish of a meal.

Early use of the term
The word entrée as a culinary term first appears in print around 1536, in the Petit traicté auquel verrez la maniere de faire cuisine, in a collection of menus at the end of the book.  There, the first stage of each meal is called the entree de table (entrance to the table); the second stage consists of potaiges (foods boiled or simmered "in pots"); the third consists of one or more services de rost (meat or fowl "roasted" in dry heat); and the last is the issue de table (departure from the table).  These four stages of the meal appear consistently in this order in all the books that derive from the Petit traicté. 

The terms entree de table and issue de table are organizing words, "describing the structure of a meal rather than the food itself".  The terms potaiges and rost indicate cooking methods but not ingredients.  The menus, though, give some idea of both the ingredients and the cooking methods that were characteristic of each stage of the meal.

Sausages, offal, and raw "watery" fruits (oranges, plums, peaches, apricots, and grapes) were apparently considered uniquely appropriate for starting the meal, as those foods appear only in the entree de table.  Other dishes considered appropriate for the entree stage may also appear in later stages of the meal, such as venison cooked in various ways (in the entree, potaiges, and rost services) and savory pies and sauced meats (in the entree and rost services).  The distribution of dishes is very similar to that of the menus in the Ménagier de Paris, written 150 years before the Petit traicté.

"Classical Order" of service

The stages of the meal underwent several significant changes between the mid-16th and mid-17th century.  Notably, the entrée became the second stage of the meal and potage became the first.  At this point, the term "entrée" had lost its literal meaning and had come to refer to a certain type of dish, unrelated to its place in the meal.  The cookbooks and dictionaries of the 17th and 18th centuries rarely discuss directly the composition of the dishes for each stage of the meal, but they routinely designate recipes or include lists of dishes appropriate to each stage.  Nevertheless, entrées and the dishes of the other stages of the meal can be distinguished from each other by certain characteristics, such as their ingredients, cooking methods, and serving temperatures.  The distinct characteristics of the entrée were at first loosely observed, or perhaps more accurately, the "rules" were in a formative stage for several decades.  By the early 18th century, though, certain ingredients and cooking methods were increasingly confined to the entrée stage of the meal.

In the 17th, 18th, and 19th centuries, entrées, on meat days, included most butchers’ meats (but not ham), suckling pig, fowl, furred and feathered game, and offal.  Eggs, on meat days, were never served as entrées; they were served only as entremets.  Vegetables often made up part of the sauce or garnish, but entrées were always meat dishes; vegetable dishes were served only as entremets. 

On lean days, fish replaced meat and fowl in every stage of the meal.  Even on lean days, few entrées were composed only of vegetables.  During Lent, though, vegetable entrées ("entrées en racines", encompassing all vegetables, not just "roots") were sometimes served. 

Moist cooking methods were characteristic of the entrée stage of the meal, typical preparations being sautés, ragoûts, and fricassées.  Meat or fowl (but not fish) might be roasted, but it was first wrapped in paper, or stuffed with a forcemeat, or barded with herbs or anchovies, or finished in a sauce, or prepared in some other way to keep the dish from browning and crisping like a true roast.  Savory pies and pastries were baked in dry heat, but the enclosed meat cooked in its own steam and juices. 

All entrées were served hot, and this was a salient feature of entrées until the 19th century.

In the mid-18th century, entrées were increasingly divided into new categories based on the content and preparation of the dish. "Hors d'œuvres", which, in the late 17th century, were served at several points during the meal, were considered a type of entrée in the 18th century, but by the 19th century, they had become a distinct stage of the meal.  Large, whole joints of meat (usually beef or veal) and very large fowl (turkey and geese) were categorized as grandes or grosses entrées.  When roasted, those whole joints and fowl were called "spit-roasted entrées" (entrées de broche); they were always served with a sauce to distinguish them from true roasts.  When boiled, a joint of beef was called the "le bouilli"; this was generally the first of the entrées consumed in the meal, after the potages and hors d’œuvres.  In the late 18th century, the practice arose of removing the empty soup tureens and replacing them with additional grosses entrées or entrées de broche; these replacement dishes were commonly called "relevés"; they were last of the entrées consumed at the meal, though they often appear on menus right after the potages.  Taken together, all these bulky dishes were called "substantial entrées" (fortes entrées). 

The most numerous of the entrées at any meal were the "ordinary entrées" (entrées ordinaires), consumed between the bouilli and the relevés.  In composition, they were distinguished from the fortes entrées by the relatively small size of their ingredients.  Small fowl could be served whole; but large fowl and large joints of meat were cut into pieces or fillets.  Despite the designation "ordinary", these entrées were much more elaborate and refined than fortes entrées.

Changes in the 19th century

In the 19th century, due at least in part to the collapse of the church's authority in France, rules governing meat and lean days were followed irregularly.  In particular, fish was commonly served on meat days, providing even more variety to the meal.  Fish came to be considered a classic relevé, and in some cases was served as a separate "fish course".  After the 1820s, the bouilli was no longer routinely served at fine dinners.  In addition, cold entrées became increasingly common over the course of the 19th century, a marked change from earlier practices. 

Following the widespread adoption of service à la russe in the 1860s, dishes were presented one after another rather than being placed on the table for guests to select what they wanted.  In this new type of service, the ordinary entrées were often served after the relevés, particularly in France; in England, the ordinary entrées more commonly preceded the relevés, as they had in the 18th century.  At this point, the two terms had completely lost their literal meanings.  "Entrée" referred to those entrées served in slices, fillets, or small pieces; "relevé" referred to those entrées served as large joints, whole birds, or whole fish. 

Distinctions between the various types of entrées (grosses, grandes, de broche, relevé) had fallen out of use by the end of the 19th century.  The entrée as a stage of a multi-course meal persisted in some circles after the Great War; but with the broad cultural transformations of the 20th century, the word lost its connection to its traditional meaning.

Modern French cuisine
In France, the modern meaning of "entrée" on a restaurant menu is the small course that precedes the main course in a three-course meal, i.e., the course which in British usage is often called the "starter" and in American usage the "appetizer". Thus a typical modern French three-course meal in a restaurant consists of "entrée" (first course or starter (UK); appetizer (U.S.)), followed by the "plat" or "plat principal" (the main course), and then dessert or cheese. This sequence is commonly found in prix fixe menus.

Notes, references, and sources

Notes

References

Sources

See also

Full course dinner
Food presentation

External links

The Language of Food: Entrée

Food and drink terminology
Courses (food)

is:Forréttur